The 6th Wisconsin Infantry Regiment was an infantry regiment that served in the Union Army during the American Civil War. It spent most of the war as a part of the famous  Iron Brigade in the Army of the Potomac.

Service
The 6th Wisconsin was raised at Madison, Wisconsin, and mustered into Federal service July 16, 1861, for a term of three years. It saw severe fighting in the 1862 Northern Virginia Campaign, fighting at Brawner's Farm in the waning hours of August 28th, 1862, where they would receive their baptism of fire, losing 72 men killed or wounded. After the devastating defeat at Second Bull Run, the third corp was transferred back into the Army Of The Potomac. In the subsequent Maryland Campaign of 1862 the 6th would assault Turners Gap at South Mountain, losing 90 men, then would once again be heavily engaged at The Battle Of Antietam, losing an extra 152 casualties, and resulting in the wounding of Colonel Edward Bragg. The 6th would not see any major action at The Battle Of Fredricksburg, but would partake in the assault at Fizthugh's Crossing, April 29th, 1863. Colonel Bragg would once again suffer wounds at The Battle Of Chancellorsville, leaving command of the regiment to Lieutenant Colonel Rufus Dawes. 

The 6th's next major engagement would be at the crossroads town of Gettysburg, July 1st 1863. However, the 6th would be held in reserve on Seminary Ridge, while the rest of the Iron Brigade advanced to Herbst's Woods, being led by General John Reynolds himself. The 6th would finally get their turn to bring glory to Wisconsin when they are ordered to attack an exposed Confederate Brigade under the command of Joseph R. Davis. The 6th would form up on the Chambersburg Pike behind a fence, and aided by the 14th Brooklyn and the 95th New York, they would assault the Confederates, who had entrenched themselves in a unfinished railroad cut. The Badgers would suffer heavily in the charge, losing one man for every yard they advanced. The following is quoted from Rufus Dawes. "I first mistook the strange maneuver for a retreat, but was undeceived by the deadly fire, which they at once began to pour from their cover in the cut."  Dawes loses ten men carrying the colors, and nearly half of all available officers. "Men were dying in the twenties and thirties, but still, the boys crowded around the colors, and went forward." Finally, after withstanding the flame of death that was being directed at the Badgers, the rebel flag was within reach, and a horrific melee ensued in the cut. "Corporal Egelston seized the rebel battle flag, but was struck, and fell, mortally wounded. Private Anderson, furious at the shooting of his comrade, with a terrific blow split the skull of the rebel who had shot young Egelston." After several minutes of deadly melee, Corporal Francis A. Waller seized the colors of the 2nd Mississippi, and held it aloft, compelling most of the rebels to surrender, and cease their fighting. The Wisconsinites would hold their position in the  railroad cut, until ordered to retreat with the rest of the 1st Corp and the Iron Brigade.  

The 6th would take positions on Culps Hill with the rest of the Brigade, and would partake in a nighttime attack to retake some earthworks previously occupied by Federals.

168 Badgers would lose their lives at the Battle of Gettysburg, with most of all available officers put out of duty. After Gettysburg, the Brigade would be briefly joined by the 167th Pennsylvania, who, convinced that their enlistments had expired, refused to march. As a result, the Brigade was ordered to shoot the unruly Pennsylvanians, who quickly went into line, with little to no doubt in their mind that the hardened veterans of the Iron Brigade would not hesitate to shoot them, the 6th was ordered to march behind the 167th at bayonet point, with orders to shoot anyone who fell out of line.  

The Iron Brigade would see service in the Overland Campaign of 64', fighting in the Battle Of The Wilderness the 6th, along with the rest of the Brigade, would assault Confederate lines on May 5th. The Brigade would gain initial success, however, they would advance unsupported, and as a result their lines would be flanked. As a result of heavy pressure the Brigade would retreat in disorder, unexpected for a veteran Brigade of their status.  During the subsequent Battle Of Spotyslvania Court House, the 6th would once again assault Rebel earthworks at Laurel Hill, and then again at the Cold Harbor. Total losses for the Badgers during the Overland Campaign would add up to 140. The 6th Wisconsin and the rest of the Iron Brigade would see service during the siege of Petersburg and at the battle of Weldon Railroad (or Globe Tavern). The regiment would see considerable service till the end of the war.           

The regiment participated in the Grand Review of the Armies on May 23, 1865, and then mustered out at Louisville, Kentucky, on July 2, 1865.

Total enlistments and casualties
The 6th Wisconsin Infantry initially mustered 1,029 men and later recruited an additional 601 men, for a total of 1,630 men.
The regiment lost 16 officers and 228 enlisted men killed in action or who later died of their wounds, plus another 1 officer and  112 enlisted men who died of disease, for a total of 357 fatalities.

Commanders

 Colonel Lysander Cutler (May 28, 1861November 29, 1862) was promoted to brigadier general, commanded the Iron Brigade.  He served through nearly the entire war and received an honorary brevet to major general.
 Colonel Edward S. Bragg (March 10, 1863June 25, 1864) began the war as captain of Co. E.  He was later promoted to brigadier general and commanded the Iron Brigade.  After the war he became a U.S. congressman and U.S. minister to Mexico.
 Colonel Rufus Dawes (July 5, 1864August 9, 1864) began the war as captain of Co. K, and was acting commander of the regiment at the Battle of Gettysburg.  He mustered out at the end of his three-year enlistment and received an honorary brevet to brigadier general.  After the war, he served as a U.S. congressman and wrote an extensive memoir of his Civil War service.  His son, Charles G. Dawes, was the 30th vice president of the United States.
 Colonel John Azor Kellogg (December 10, 1864July 14, 1865) began the war as 1st lieutenant of Co. K, and served as adjutant to the brigade commander in 1863 and was a prisoner of war for several months in 1864.  He mustered out with the regiment at the end of the war and received an honorary brevet to brigadier general.  After the war, he served in the Wisconsin State Senate and wrote a memoir of his time as a prisoner of war.

Notable people

 Oscar Bartlett, assistant surgeon, later became chief surgeon for the 3rd Wisconsin Infantry Regiment.  Resigned due to disability.  Before the war, he had served in the Wisconsin Legislature.
 Francis A. Deleglise was a corporal in Co. E and was wounded at Antietam and Gettysburg.  After the war he served as a Wisconsin state legislator and was a founder of Antigo, Wisconsin.
 Daniel J. Dill, captain of Co. B, later became colonel of the 30th Wisconsin Infantry Regiment.  After the war served as a Wisconsin state legislator.
 John C. Hall, chief surgeon, later served as a Wisconsin state senator.
 Frank A. Haskell, adjutant, became adjutant and staff aide to General John Gibbon, later commissioned colonel of the 36th Wisconsin Infantry Regiment, killed in action at Cold Harbor.
 John J. Jenkins was a private in Co. A.  Later in life, he became a seven-term U.S. congressman and a federal judge.
 Robert Lees, private in Co. H, later became first sergeant, wounded at Gettysburg.  After the war served as a Wisconsin state senator and county judge.
 James R. Lyon, initially managed a supply wagon, later became a private in Co. I.  After the war served as a Wisconsin state legislator.
 Adam Gale Malloy, captain of Co. A, later became colonel of the 17th Wisconsin Infantry Regiment and received an honorary brevet to brigadier general.  
 George Davis McDill, private and corporal in Co. I, later became captain of Co. K in the 37th Wisconsin Infantry Regiment.  After the war served as a Wisconsin state legislator.
 Albert T. Morgan was captain of Co. H near the end of the war.  He previously served as captain of Co. B in the "independent battalion" remnant of the 2nd Wisconsin Infantry Regiment, which was absorbed into the 6th Wisconsin Infantry in November 1864.  He received a double-honorary brevet to lieutenant colonel at the end of the war.  After the war, he was a Mississippi state senator and wrote a memoir of his experiences in the reconstruction-era south.
 David K. Noyes, first lieutenant and captain in Co. A, severely wounded at Antietam.  Later served as lieutenant colonel of the 49th Wisconsin Infantry Regiment.  After the war served as a postmaster and newspaper publisher.
 Peter Polin was 2nd lieutenant in Co. H, but resigned before the regiment left Wisconsin.  He elected posthumously to the Wisconsin Assembly in 1870, having died the day before the election.
 John Starks, sergeant in Co. A, was the son of Argalus Starks.  He was badly wounded at Gainesville, later commissioned captain of Co. K, 23rd Wisconsin Infantry Regiment, and was mortally wounded at Vicksburg.
 Benjamin Sweet, major and lieutenant colonel, later served as colonel of the 21st Wisconsin Infantry Regiment and was badly wounded and disabled at Perryville.  Given command of the prisoner-of-war camp Camp Douglas.  After the war, received an honorary brevet to brigadier general.
 John Tester, first lieutenant of Co. H, later served as a Wisconsin state legislator.
 Francis A. Wallar was corporal, sergeant, and later 2nd lieutenant in Company I.  He was awarded the Medal of Honor for actions at Gettysburg.  After the war he was sheriff of Vernon County, Wisconsin.
 Jerome Anthony Watrous, private and sergeant in Co. E, commissioned as adjutant of the regiment and received an honorary brevet to captain.  After the war served as a Wisconsin state legislator and historian, and served as a U.S. Army officer in the Spanish–American War.

See also

 Iron Brigade
 List of Wisconsin Civil War units
 Wisconsin in the American Civil War

References

Further reading
 
 
 The Civil War Archive
 Herdegen, Lance J., "Those Damned Black Hats!" The Iron Brigade in the Gettysburg Campaign, Savas Beatie LLC, October 2008. http://www.savasbeatie.com

Military units and formations established in 1861
Military units and formations disestablished in 1865
Units and formations of the Union Army from Wisconsin
Iron Brigade
1861 establishments in Wisconsin